Single-hander may refer to:

 Single-hander (EastEnders), an episode of EastEnders in which only one character is featured
 One who practices single-handed sailing

See also
 Single Handed (disambiguation)